Duncan Smith (dates of birth and death unknown) was an English first-class cricketer and Royal Air Force officer.

A member of the Royal Air Force, Smith was selected to play for the Combined Services cricket team in a first-class cricket match against Gloucestershire at Bristol in 1947. Batting twice in the match, Smith was dismissed for 22 runs by Sam Cook in the Combined Services first-innings, while in their second-innings he was dismissed for a single run by Monty Cranfield. With his leg break bowling, Smith bowled eleven wicketless overs in Gloucestershire's first-innings, conceding 50 runs.

References

External links

Date of birth unknown
Date of death unknown
Royal Air Force officers
English cricketers
Combined Services cricketers